Base Air was an airline based in Nepal.

History 
The Civil Aviation Authority of Nepal granted Base Air an air operators licence to fly to all sectors in the country in 2004. Base Air planned to start operations using British Aerospace ATP's in September 2004. Despite this, by 2007 the airline had failed to start operations.

References 

Defunct airlines of Nepal
2004 establishments in Nepal
2007 disestablishments in Nepal